Kelly Hill may refer to:

Kelly Hill, West Virginia, an unincorporated community in Kanawha County
Kelly Hill Conservation Park, a protected area on Kangaroo Island in South Australia
Kelli Hill (born 1960), an American gymnastics coach

See also
Kelly Hills, an Australian mountain range
Kelly Park (disambiguation)